The World Scrabble Championship 1997 was the fourth World Scrabble Championship. The winner was Joel Sherman of the United States.

Format

The World Scrabble Championship 1997 was held in the Stouffer Renaissance Mayflower Hotel, Washington, D.C., and was the second to be held in the United States. Eighty players played a Swiss tournament of twenty-one games each, with each player playing seven games on each of the first three days. The two top players from this tournament then played a best-of-five game final to decide who would be World Scrabble Champion 1997.

Prize money was provided by the Milton Bradley Company, owned by the tournament's sponsor Hasbro, to a total value of $50,100. The winner received $25,000, the runner-up $10,000 and the remainder of the top twenty players received prizes down to $150.

This was the first World Championship to have featured a
live web site,
a copy of which is now archived at the main WSC web site.

Results

After the initial Swiss tournament, the top two players were Joel Sherman (16 wins, winning spread +829) and Matt Graham (15 wins, winning spread +993). Notably, all the top four players were representing the United States. This was particularly surprising since the WSC uses the SOWPODS wordlist, which includes many words not present in the traditional American wordlist, TWL 98.

Graham took the first game of the finals 409-334 but lost a 387-363 squeaker in the second after missing BOWNED.

In game three, Graham made another error when he played HERB instead of BERTH and Sherman took another close game, 419-405.

In game four, Sherman got off to a big lead and began shutting down the board. Graham took a chance on FLEXERS for 101 points, but Sherman successfully challenged it off. Graham drew a rack full of consonants. Sherman won the game and was crowned World Scrabble Champion, after losing in the final two years earlier.

Complete results

FINALS:
Game 1: Graham 409 – Sherman 334
Game 2: Sherman 387 – Graham 363
Game 3: Sherman 419 – Graham 405
Game 4: Sherman 410 – Graham 324

References

External links
Official website

1997
1997 in the United States
1997 in Washington, D.C.
November 1997 events in the United States